is a direct-to-video anime film released in Japan on March 1, 1985. It was also released in theaters on December 21, 1985.

The story is that of Yoko Asagiri who finds that the love song she wrote acted as a bridge transporting her to a fantastical alternate world called "Ashanti." There, the ruler of that world wants her song so that he could use it to open a doorway to Yoko's world and conquer it with his armies. Using the artifacts left behind by the legendary warrior Leda who prophesied her arrival, Yoko and her newfound friends must stop the tyrant's ambition and return both worlds to their proper place and balance.

Plot
Yoko Asagiri composes a piano sonata to show her love to a young man. While listening to the song on a walkman she passes him but doesn't have the courage to confess. Then she is transported to a fantastical world. There she meets a talking dog. While talking to the dog, she sees off in the sky a reflection of her world. She then discovers that she can transport herself between the worlds while listening to the song. Then her walkman is stolen by strange men riding mechanical creatures who attack her. Yoko then transforms into a powerful sword wielding warrior and defeats them.

They meet a young girl named Yoni who explains that the floating castle, Garuba, nearby is ruled by Zell, an evil man using Leda's power for evil. He wishes to open a portal to the world of Noa to conquer it. Yoni leads her to a giant robot named the Armor of Leda that can transform into a ship called the Wings of Leda. Zell's floating towers attack and Yoni's giant robot, Rubber Star, is destroyed during the battle. Yoni and Yoko then fly to Zell's castle. They confront Zell, who erects a force field separating Yoko from her friends. Zell tells her that she came to this world because she wanted to escape from her world.

Zell captures her friends, and puts Yoko to sleep to use her to help control the portal machine. There Yoko dreams where she is dating the young man. Instead of walking past him, she started talking to him. She breaks the spell, rescues her friends, and the machine overloads. Zell, in anger lunges towards Yoko. Yoko stabs him, killing him. While the castle is destroyed Yoko and her friends escape. Yoko then returns to her world. she sees the boy and runs after him to talk to him.

Voice actors
Hiromi Tsuru - Asagiri Yōko
Kei Tomiyama - Ringamu
Chika Sakamoto - Yoni
Shuichi Ikeda - Zell
Mahito Tsujimura - Chizamu
Naoko Watanabe - Omuka
Kōji Totani - Soldier A
Kōzō Shioya - Soldier B

Production
 Director: Kunihiko Yuyama
 Script: Junki Takegami, Kunihiko Yuyama
 Original Concept: Kaname Production
 Character Design: Mutsumi Inomata
 Art Director: Tadami Shimokawa
 Mechanical design: Takahiro Toyomasu
 Sound Director: Noriyoshi Matsuura
 Director of Photography: Shigerou Sugimura
 Animation Coordinator: Yōsei Morino

Release
An English release of the film was acquired by The Right Stuf International in February 1997. It was officially released in North America on both subbed and dubbed VHS formats in May 1997. The OVA was republished on November 27, 2000 The company has yet to release the OVA on DVD in the region.

See also
 Hideyuki Kikuchi
 The Wing of Madoola
 Valis: The Fantasm Soldier (which has a similar Japanese title ("Mugen Senshi Valis"), a somewhat similar plot, and a main character with a similar name (Yūko))
 Phantasy Star

References

External links
 
 

1985 anime OVAs
1985 Japanese novels
1985 manga
Isekai anime and manga
Isekai novels and light novels
Shōjo manga